= Operation of Sidi Aïch =

Date	March 2015
Location	Sidi Aïch, Tunisia 34°40′38″N 8°47′32″E
Result	Tunisian victory

Belligerents
Tunisia	AQMI

Strength
unknown	10 men, 1 vehicle

Casualties and losses
unknown	9 dead, 1 wounded and prisoner

The Sidi Aïch operation was an anti-terrorist operation conducted in Tunisia in March 2015 against a group of the Tunisian branch of Al-Qaeda in the Islamic Maghreb (AQIM), the Katiba Okba Ibn Nafaa.

== Operation ==
On the evening of 28 March 2015, in Sidi Aïch in the governorate of Gafsa, the National Guard ambushed an AQIM vehicle. During the clash that followed, almost all the jihadists who occupied the vehicle were killed by the Tunisian military, with the exception of a fighter who was wounded and taken prisoner. A specialized demining group was then dispatched to the site to verify that the corpses are not booby-trapped.

According to the Tunisian government, nine jihadists were killed during the operation, including Algerian Lokman Abu Sakhr, leader of the katiba (brigade) Okba Ibn Nafaa, of AQIM. Of the eight other jihadists killed, three were Algerian and five Tunisian.

The Tunisian government also claimed that Lokmane Abou Sakhr and Katiba Okba Ibn Nafaa were responsible for the attack on the Bardo Museum, even though the attack was claimed by the Islamic State and not by AQIM.
